The 2017 Mexican Grand Prix (formally known as the Formula 1 Gran Premio de México 2017) was a Formula One motor race held on 29 October 2017 at the Autódromo Hermanos Rodríguez in Mexico City.

Red Bull Racing driver Max Verstappen won the race, while Lewis Hamilton secured his fourth world title with two races remaining after championship rival Sebastian Vettel finished fourth.

Report
Hamilton came into the race with a 66-point lead over Vettel and requiring a fifth-place finish to claim his fourth world title. Sebastian Vettel needed to outscore Hamilton by 16 points to keep the championship fight alive.

Driver changes
Pierre Gasly returned to Toro Rosso after sitting out the United States Grand Prix. Gasly replaced Daniil Kvyat, while the team retained Brendon Hartley (now considered a regular driver and using number 28) in their second car.

Qualifying
Vettel pipped Verstappen to pole position, the two ahead of the two Mercedes cars of Hamilton and Valtteri Bottas with the Mercedes cars yet again struggling in high downforce circuits but were much closer to Ferrari and Red Bull than in the previous high downforce track in Singapore. Kimi Räikkönen qualified in 5th ahead of Esteban Ocon, Daniel Ricciardo, who had problems heating up his tyres, Nico Hülkenberg, Carlos Sainz and Sergio Pérez.

Race
Ricciardo took a 20 place grid penalty after replacing a part on his power unit before the race.

Verstappen managed to force himself past Vettel at the second corner and in doing so allowed Hamilton to overtake Vettel. However, Vettel, on the entry to the third corner, clipped Verstappen's right rear tyre and then made a larger impact to Hamilton's right rear tyre. This greatly damaged Vettel's front wing and he had to pit on the first lap to get it replaced. While Verstappen survived the contact with Vettel and minor contact with Hamilton, Hamilton obtained a puncture from the collision with Vettel and had to limp back to the pits and replace his tyres. This left both championship contenders in last with Vettel 19th and Hamilton in 20th, 24 seconds further behind. After the first lap, the running order was Verstappen, Bottas, Ocon, Hülkenberg, Sainz, Pérez and Lance Stroll. Sainz then spun in the high speed section and had to pit for new tyres and came out in 19th place. With Hamilton now out of the points, Vettel needed to finish 2nd in order to keep his championship hopes alive and he swiftly made his way through the field, while Hamilton, with rear diffuser damage, struggled to make his way past Sainz. In the 24th lap, Hülkenberg retired with an engine problem in what was his fourth retirement in five races and his third in a row. Brendon Hartley's Toro Rosso ground to a halt on the 31st lap and brought out the Virtual Safety Car, allowing Räikkönen to jump Ocon into 3rd place and Stroll to jump Pérez into 5th place. Vettel, by the flag, had managed to battle his way to fourth place, but it wasn't enough to stop Hamilton, who finished 9th, from winning the World Championship. Ricciardo (who had retired after a few laps while running in the points), Sainz and Marcus Ericsson, having been running the points for a long time, were the other retirees. Verstappen won for the third time in his career ahead of Bottas and Räikkönen.

Classification

Qualifying

Notes
 – Daniel Ricciardo received a 20-place grid penalty for exceeding his quota of power unit components.
 – Brendon Hartley received a 20-place grid penalty for exceeding his quota of power unit components.
 – Fernando Alonso received a 20-place grid penalty for exceeding his quota of power unit components.
 – Stoffel Vandoorne received a 35-place grid penalty for exceeding his quota of power unit components.
 – Pierre Gasly failed to set a time within the 107% requirement, but received permission from the stewards to start the race; he also received a 20-place grid penalty for exceeding his quota of power unit components.

Race

Championship standings after the race

Drivers' Championship standings

Constructors' Championship standings

 Note: Only the top five positions are included for the sets of standings.
 Bold text indicates the 2017 World Champions.

References

Mexico
Mexican Grand Prix
Grand Prix
Mexican Grand Prix